Talygen Business Intelligence, officially Talygen Inc., is a software development company in Grapevine, Texas. It is known for its eponymous web based business automation software, that first gained publicity in January 2014 when PC Magazine included it in a list of Top Ten Tools for Small Biz at CES 2014. The idea behind the software product has been described as "charming" by Frankfurter Allgemeine.

Products 

Talygen Business Intelligence is the company's flagship product. It is a software tool that draws on cloud technology to perform "customer relationship management, expense accounting, manage leave [sic] and many other administrative issues" for enterprises.

See also 

 Comparison of project management software
 Comparison of time tracking software
 Comparison of PSA systems

References

External links 
 Official site

Companies based in Palo Alto, California
Software companies based in California
Web applications
Cloud applications
Business software
Software companies of the United States